Carlos Antonio López Cortéz (born 16 July 1996) is a Mexican footballer who plays as a goalkeeper for Orange County SC.

References

External links

Carlos López Cortéz at Soccerway US

1996 births
Living people
Mexican footballers
Association football goalkeepers
Club Tijuana footballers
Dorados de Sinaloa footballers
Orange County SC players
USL Championship players
Soccer players from California
Sportspeople from Orange County, California